Al-Aziz Jamal ad-Din Yusuf was the son of Barsbay, and a Mamluk sultan of Egypt from 7 June to 9 September 1438.

References

Burji sultans
15th-century Mamluk sultans
1420s births
Year of death unknown
Circassian Mamluks